Mogolo is a city in the western Gash-Barka region of Eritrea.

Location
It is the principal town in the Mogolo district of the Gash-Barka region.

Nearby towns and villages include Chibabo (2.3 nm), Attai (4.1 nm), Abaredda (6.7 nm), Algheden (14.7 nm), Bet Mahala (18.6 nm), Aula (8.0 nm) and Samero (8.0 nm).

Gash-Barka Region
Populated places in Eritrea